The Women's 4 x 400 metres relay race at the 2013 European Athletics Indoor Championships was held on March 3, 2013, in Gothenburg.

Records

Final

The final was held at 18:30.

References

External links
Report of the race

4 × 400 metres relay at the European Athletics Indoor Championships
2013 European Athletics Indoor Championships
2013 in women's athletics